Corrado Michelozzi (16 August 1883 – 1965) was an Italian painter, active in Livorno in a Divisionist style, mainly depicting still lifes with floral and fruit arrangements.

He was born in Livorno. As a boy he trained as a decorative painter of frescoes. He was part of the group of artist attending the Caffè Bardi in Livorno. He painted the theater curtain or sipario of the Teatro Goldoni in Livorno. In 1913, he exhibited the Secessione exhibition in Rome. After 1920, he participated in the exhibitions of the Gruppo Labronico until World War II, and then again in 1946. He was one of the founders of the group.

References

20th-century Italian painters
Italian male painters
Divisionist painters
People from Livorno
Painters from Tuscany
1883 births
1965 deaths
19th-century Italian male artists
20th-century Italian male artists

Gruppo Labronico